Count Your Lucky Stars Records is an American independent record label based in Fenton, Michigan. The label has released albums by bands such as Empire! Empire! (I Was a Lonely Estate), Joie De Vivre, Annabel, Moving Mountains, Benton Falls, Snowing, Into It. Over It. and CSTVT. It is involved in the emo revival movement and is run by Keith and Cathy Latinen of Empire! Empire!.

Bands

Current

 Camp Trash
 The Cardboard Swords
 Certain People I Know
 CSTVT
 Dowsing
 Driving on City Sidewalks
 Drunk Uncle 
 Empire! Empire! (I Was a Lonely Estate)
 Football, etc.
 Free Throw
 The Goalie’s Anxiety At The Penalty Kick
 The Great Albatross
 Innards
 Joie De Vivre
 Kid Brother Collective
 Kittyhawk
 Long Knives
 Mimisiku
 Mountains for Clouds
 Parting
 Recreational Drugs
 Star Funeral
 Thank You, I'm Sorry
 The Reptilian
 Tiny Blue Ghost
 Rika
 Two Knights
 Warren Franklin & the Founding Fathers
 Zookeeper

Past

 American Thunder Band
 Annabel
 Ape Up!
 Arrows
 Benton Falls
 Boris Smile
 Boyfriends
 Brave Bird
 Brave Captain, the Rescue
 Calculator
 Cloud Mouth
 Denison Witmer
 Dikembe
 Foxing
 Hightide Hotel
 I Am the Branch
 Into It. Over It.
 Jet Set Sail
 Kind of Like Spitting
 Lindsay Minton
 List
 Malegoat
 Merchant Ships
 Mikey Erg
 Monument
 Moving Mountains
 Parker
 Penfold
 Pennies
 Perfect Future
 Prawn
 Pswingset
 Sinai Vessel
 Sirdidymous
 Snowing
 Victor! Fix the Sun
 Youth Pictures of Florence Henderson

See also
 List of record labels

References

External links 
 

American independent record labels
Alternative rock record labels